The 2012–13 international cricket season was from September 2012 to March 2013. It began with the ICC World Twenty20, which the West Indies won by defeating host nation Sri Lanka in the final. As a result, Sri Lanka and the West Indies rose to number one and two respectively in the ICC T20I Championship rankings. The season included the first bilateral series between India and Pakistan since 2007. Bilateral ties between the two countries had been severed since the 2008 Mumbai attacks.

In Test cricket, South Africa had their first successful defences of the ICC Test Championship number-one ranking they acquired from England in August 2012. They started with winning a three-Test series 1–0 in Australia, and won all their home matches, against New Zealand and Pakistan. England won a Test series in India for the first time since 1984–85. It was also India's first Test series defeat at home since the 2004–05 season. India then bounced back with a 4–0 victory in a home Test series against a restructuring Australian team. This was a complete turnaround from their previous meeting in 2011–12, when India lost 0–4 in Australia. In series of three or more Tests, it was also the first whitewash against Australia since 1969–70.

In the ICC ODI Championship, South Africa dropped from number two to four after a home series loss to the ninth-ranked New Zealand. South Africa were experimenting with the make-up of their ODI squad at the time. India and England lost an ODI series each to leave them ranked number one and two respectively for the second half of the season. No team was able to perform well consistently ahead of the Champions Trophy to be held the following season.

Season overview

Pre-season rankings

 Note: Zimbabwe is currently unranked in Tests, as it has played insufficient matches. It has 167 points and a rating of 42.

September

ICC World Twenty20

Group stage

Super Eights

Knockout stage

Kenya in Namibia

October

New Zealand in Sri Lanka

November

South Africa in Australia

West Indies in Bangladesh

England in India

December

Sri Lanka in Australia

New Zealand in South Africa

Pakistan in India

February

West Indies in Australia

Pakistan in South Africa

England in New Zealand

Australia in India

Zimbabwe in the West Indies

March

Afghanistan vs Scotland in the United Arab Emirates

Bangladesh in Sri Lanka

Kenya vs Canada in the United Arab Emirates

Ireland in the United Arab Emirates

References

External links
 2012/13 season on ESPN Cricinfo

2012 in cricket
2013 in cricket